The Bia is a river that is situated primarily in Ghana and flows through Ghana and Ivory Coast, emptying into Aby Lagoon. A hydroelectric dam was built across the Bia at Ayamé in 1959, causing the formation of Lake Ayame.

References

Rivers of Ghana
Rivers of Ivory Coast
International rivers of Africa